Never Go Back is the eighteenth book in the Jack Reacher series written by Lee Child.
It was published on 3 September 2013 in the United States.
The book continues the storyline covered in the novels 61 Hours, Worth Dying For and A Wanted Man. The novel, like a majority of the Jack Reacher novels, is narrated in third-person point of view.

Plot
At a motel outside Washington D.C., former Army cop Jack Reacher is confronted by two men, who call him a disgrace and order him to leave town. Reacher refuses, and subdues them in a brief fistfight.

Earlier that same day, Reacher arrives at the headquarters of his old unit, the 110th MP Special Investigations Unit, to meet with its commander, Major Susan Turner. When he arrives, however, he discovers that Turner has been relieved of command. Her replacement, Col. Morgan, informs Reacher that he is under investigation in two cases: a suspected homicide dating back nearly sixteen years, and a lawsuit filed by Candice Dayton, a woman who alleges that she and Reacher had an affair when he was stationed in South Korea, and that he is the father of her fifteen-year-old daughter, Samantha. When Reacher points out that the military has no authority to investigate him due to his civilian status, Morgan reinstates him as an officer and gives him a room at a local motel, where the fight occurs later that night. Learning that Turner has been incarcerated on suspicion of taking a bribe, Reacher goes to visit her, but learns that she has specifically requested that he not be allowed to do so.

The next morning, Reacher meets with his lawyers, Maj. Helen Sullivan and Cap. Tracy Edmonds, and learns the details of both cases. He also meets Col. Moorcroft, Turner's attorney, and asks him to get her released from custody. When he returns to police headquarters, he discovers that Morgan has disappeared, and that two men from the 110th on duty in Afghanistan have gone missing. Reacher uses his authority as an officer to order a search for them, embarrassing Morgan and getting him banned from setting foot in the headquarters or issuing any more orders. Shortly thereafter, police from the 75th MP, led by Warrant Officer Pete Espin, take him into custody and bring him to the same prison where Turner is held. Reacher is subsequently informed by a detective that Moorcroft has been severely beaten, and that he is considered a prime suspect.

Reacher arranges a meeting with Sullivan to buy time until Turner arrives, and then stages an escape, stealing Sullivan's ID and giving it to Turner. The two find her car and leave, but are intercepted by Metro police and end up ditching their ride and fleeing to Berryville, where Reacher informs Turner that her men in Afghanistan were assassinated, and that the charges against her were invented to cover up some sort of illegal activity. Finding themselves tracked by strange men, they manage to hitch a ride into West Virginia.

Reacher obtains money and a car from a deceased meth dealer named Claughton, but his relatives identify the car, locate Reacher and Turner's motel, and confront them. Reacher manages to intimidate them into backing down, and takes one of their trucks. Turner explains that the mission in Afghanistan was linked to a Pashtun elder, later identified as Emal Zadran, and theorizes that Morgan, the strange men, and some higher-ups in the army's chain of command (named in the story as Romeo and Juliet) are working together to protect him. She also insists that Reacher go to Los Angeles to deal with Dayton. They track down Samantha, but Espin later confirms that the paternity claim is bogus as he found that a man named Romeo had secured a falsified birth certificate from a crooked lawyer in LA and had Candice sign it for $100. Sullivan also discovers that the homicide charge was faked as well, clearing Reacher of any potential legal consequences.

Through Edmonds, Reacher and Turner learn that an illicit operation was being run through North Carolina under the control of Crew Scully and Gabriel Montague, both Deputy Chiefs of Staff, involving the smuggling of contraband using empty ordnance crates. Reacher arranges for Morgan and Staff Sgt. Ezra Shrago, one of the smugglers, to be arrested, and locates Scully and Montague at Dove Cottage, a private club, where both men choose to commit suicide rather than be arrested. Morgan and Shrago reveal that Zadran had been supplying their bosses with opium, and Turner's name is finally cleared, allowing her to resume command. They part ways, and Reacher throws his phone in the Potomac and sits by the bank, alone.

Critical reception
Janet Maslin, writing in The New York Times, stated that the book "may be the best desert island reading in the series. It's exceptionally well plotted. And full of wild surprises. And wise about Reacher's peculiar nature. And positively Bunyanesque in its admiring contributions to Reacher lore."

Film adaptation
Paramount Pictures and Skydance Media produced the 2016 film adaptation, Jack Reacher: Never Go Back, as a sequel to 2012 film, Jack Reacher. The film was written and directed by Edward Zwick and features Tom Cruise reprising his role as Reacher.

References

External links

2013 British novels
British novels adapted into films
English novels
Jack Reacher books
Third-person narrative novels
Bantam Press books